Bicellaria vana  is a species of fly in the family Hybotidae. It is found in the  Palearctic .

References

Hybotidae
Insects described in 1926